Euonymus serratifolius is a species of plant in the family Celastraceae. It is endemic to Kerala and Tamil Nadu in India.

References

serratifolius
Flora of Kerala
Flora of Tamil Nadu
Endangered plants
Taxonomy articles created by Polbot